Brás is a station on the Line 3-Red of São Paulo Metro and on the Lines 7-Ruby, 10-Turquoise, 11-Coral, 12-Sapphire and the Service 710 of CPTM.

History
The first station at this location was opened on February 16, 1867, under the name 'Braz' by the São Paulo Railway (SPR). On November 6, 1875, the Northern Railway (Estrada de Ferro do Norte, later the Estrada de Ferro Central do Brasil) opened a terminal station, called the 'Estação do Norte' for their northern rail lines. The name of this station was changed to "Roosevelt" on September 15, 1945, by presidential decree in homage to the American President Franklin Roosevelt, who died that year.

During the 1950s the government took control of the lines operated by the SPR, and creating the National Rail Company RFFSA (liquidated in 2007). During the 1980s, with the construction of the East-West Line (Red line 3 on the São Paulo Metro) the train station was integrated with the newly inaugurated metro station, forming the integrated Brás station. In 1994, the CPTM assumed administration of the suburban rail service and remodeled the station. After the remodeling, the name 'Roosevelt' was officially dropped, and the station began being called Brás, as was called the original SPR station.

SPTrans lines
The following SPTrans bus lines can be accessed. Passengers may use a Bilhete Único card for transfer:

References

São Paulo Metro stations
Companhia Paulista de Trens Metropolitanos stations
Railway stations opened in 1979
1979 establishments in Brazil